Stuart David Manning (born 27 May 1979) is an English actor and model. He is known for portraying the role of Russ Owen in  the Channel 4 soap opera Hollyoaks from 2004 until 2009, and again in 2018.

Career
After leaving Art college where he studied Fine Art photography Manning joined Models One where he worked with photographer Bruce Weber on an Abercrombie and Fitch campaign. He also worked on many commercials including "Pepsi" directed by Michael Bay.

Manning started his acting career in an ITV soap opera Night and Day playing Sam Armstrong. Manning won the 2002 British Soap Awards "Hero of the Year" award for that role. He played Mark Thompson in an episode of Holby City before joining the cast of Hollyoaks in 2004. After five years of playing the role of Russell Owen, Manning decided to quit the show. He left the series in a storyline that saw him kidnap his baby son Max and leave for France.

He appeared as a contestant on the ninth series of I'm a Celebrity...Get Me Out of Here! in 2009. He finished overall in fifth place on the show.

Manning appeared in the UK tour of A Passionate Woman alongside Kaye Mellor and Anthony Lewis in 2011.

In 2014, he appeared in an episode of Doctors as Paul Carter, and in 2015, he also appeared in The Dumping Ground as Matt Branston and Casualty as Clyde Jackson, in the last of a trio of special Casualty "Noir" episodes.

In 2017, he appeared as Nik Voyle in the first episode of the school drama series Ackley Bridge and reprised his role of Nik again in series two in 2018.

In 2018, it was confirmed he would return to the role of Russ Owen in Hollyoaks after 9 years away. Russ returned to the show in August 2018. Manning departed the show again in November 2018 when Russ was killed off.

Filmography

References

External links

Stuart Manning's Official Website

Living people
1979 births
English male soap opera actors
English male models
21st-century English male actors
Place of birth missing (living people)
I'm a Celebrity...Get Me Out of Here! (British TV series) participants